The Rubik R-25 Mokány, in  and sometimes known as the R-25 Standard (class), is a Hungarian  single seat Standard Class glider of all-metal construction, first flown in 1960.  It was one of a series of similar aircraft designed by Ernő Rubik.  Only one was built.

Design and development
In 1957 a team led by Ernő Rubik designed an all-metal glider, the R-23 Gébics, with a pod and boom fuselage, V-tail, fuselage mounted fan airbrakes and corrugated wing skinning. These features were carried forward into a series of gliders that included the R-25 Mokány.  This was designed to compete as a Standard Class glider, with a span increased to 15 m (49 ft 5½ in), and introduced a laminar flow NACA 64 series wing profile.

Its straight tapered, high cantilever wing has forward sweep on the trailing edge alone.  It is built around a single spar with a D-shaped torsion box formed by the corrugated leading section, the ridges running chordwise.  The wing is fabric covered aft of the spar, apart from an outer, metal skinned area carrying Frise ailerons.  The all moving V-tail, with 90° separation and fitted with anti-balance tabs, has similar construction and plan as the wings.

The metal skinned fuselage of the Mokány has a circular cross section from the tail forwards to a point a little behind the wing trailing edge where it develops into a deep ellipse, though maintaining the horizontal upper line forward to the leading edge. Beyond this, the cockpit is covered by a single piece blown canopy; the nose is sharply pointed. There is a fixed, partially enclosed and rubber sprung monowheel undercarriage, fitted with a brake and assisted by a small tail skid. Instead of the more usual wing mounted airbrakes, the Mokány has fuselage mounted brakes which open through 90° in fan fashion, with one on either side below the wings at about 25% chord.

The Mokány is fully aerobatic and equipped for cloud flying.

Aircraft on display

The sole Mokány, HA-4300, is on display in the Transport Museum of Budapest.

Specifications (R-25 Mokány)

Notes

References

1960s Hungarian sailplanes
Rubik aircraft
Aircraft first flown in 1960
High-wing aircraft
V-tail aircraft